Somatina hombergi is a moth of the  family Geometridae. It is found in Gabon.

References

Moths described in 1967
Scopulini